Welsum is a village on the left bank of the river IJssel in the present municipality of Olst-Wijhe in the Dutch province of Overijssel. 

The village is the source of the Welsummer chicken breed. In 2001, a number of farms culled their flocks in connection with the outbreak of foot-and-mouth disease. 

The earliest existing written mention of the village (as Wilsum, kerspel Olst) dates from 1295.  The tower of the Protestant church was built around 1475. The village's flour mill, Houdt Braef Stant, dates to 1856, with restorations in 1963 (using internal parts from the mill Wippe in Hellendoorn) and 1986. It is currently being used as a dwelling.

Gallery

References

External links
 

Populated places in Overijssel
Olst-Wijhe